Rabbi Simcha Hagadol HaKohen Rappaport (Hebrew: שמחה הכהן ראפאפארט; b. 1650 - August 4, 1718) was a 17th-century Ukrainian rabbi and progenitor of the Rappaport rabbinic dynasties. Born in about 1650 in L'viv, Ukraine. His father, Rabbi Nachman of Belz was a minor rabbi and a descendant of Rashi through his mother. In his early years Rabbi Rappaport studied in L'viv. In 1688 he was appointed the Chief Rabbi of Horodna. He was later appointed to be Av Bris Din of Levov, although he died on the way there on August 4, 1718 in Szczebrzeszyn. The Soloveitchik dynasty claims Rabbi Rappaport as a notable ancestor and progenitor.

Notable descendants 

 Chaim Soloveitchik
 Yosef Dov Soloveitchik (Beis Halevi)
 Hayyim Rappaport
 Joseph B. Soloveitchik
 Yitzchok Zev Soloveitchik
 Moshe Soloveichik
 Berel Soloveichik
 Meshulam Dovid Soloveichik
 Ahron Soloveichik
 Samuel Soloveichik
 Moshe Meiselman
 Haym Soloveitchik
 Avrohom Yehoshua Soloveichik
 Mosheh Lichtenstein
 Mayer Twersky
 Meir Soloveichik
 Yitzchok Lichtenstein
 Esti Rosenberg
 Meir Kahane

References 

1650 births
1718 deaths
Ukrainian rabbis